The Reflector is a weekly newspaper that provides coverage of Battle Ground, Washington in the United States and is the legal newspaper of the City of Battle Ground.

The first issue of The Reflector – then located in Ridgefield, Washington – was published on October 8, 1909 by Kelley Loe who shortly thereafter sold it to Ellis B. Hall. In 1946, The Reflector was merged with an existing newspaper in Battle Ground, The Mid-County Record, to become The Mid-County Reflector, later shortened to The Reflector. The headquarters moved to Battle Ground in 1959.

In 2010 The Reflector was purchased by Lafromboise Communications from its owner of the previous 30 years, Marvin Case.

After 100 years of local ownership, it was purchased in 2010 by Lafromboise Communications Inc., a publisher based in Centralia, Washington, 80 miles to the north. At that time, it had a free home delivery circulation of 26,500. Steve Walker, formerly of the Lewis County Daily Chronicle, took over as publisher.

The name Reflector comes from a tradition including similar newspaper titles like "Mirror." Norwalk, Ohio and Greenville, North Carolina also have newspapers called the Reflector.

References

External links 
 thereflector.com (official web site)
 

1909 establishments in Washington (state)
Weekly newspapers published in the United States
Clark County, Washington